Foscue and Simmons Plantations, also known as Foscue Plantation, is a historic plantation house and adjoining farm complexes and national historic district located near Pollocksville, Jones County, North Carolina. The district encompasses seven contributing buildings, four contributing sites, one contributing structure, and one contributing object.  The Federal style Foscue Plantation House was built about 1821-1825 and is separately listed. Among the other contributing resources are the farm landscape, Foscue Cemetery (1849-1918), Brick Vault Site (1814-1853), four tobacco barns, Marl Pits/Ponds (c. 1940), Italianate style Simmons Cottage (c. 1870–1878), Simmons Tenant House #1 (c. 1920–1940), Marl Dredger (c. 1940), and bungalow style Christopher Stephens Simmons House (c. 1918–1920).

It was listed on the National Register of Historic Places in 1998.

References

Plantation houses in North Carolina
Houses on the National Register of Historic Places in North Carolina
Historic districts on the National Register of Historic Places in North Carolina
Federal architecture in North Carolina
Italianate architecture in North Carolina
Houses completed in 1825
Houses in Jones County, North Carolina
National Register of Historic Places in Jones County, North Carolina